The competition of the men's individual standard Xiangqi took place at the Guangzhou Chess Institute between November 13 and November 19 at the 2010 Asian Games.

Schedule
All times are China Standard Time (UTC+08:00)

Results
Legend
BH — Buchholz system

Round 1

Round 2

Round 3

Round 4

Round 5

Round 6

Round 7

Summary

References 

Round 1
Round 2
Round 3
Round 4
Round 5
Round 6
Round 7
Full Ranking Table

Xiangqi at the 2010 Asian Games